Hughie Odgers (21 December 1889 – 9 April 1958) was an Australian rules footballer who played with Melbourne in the Victorian Football League (VFL).

Notes

External links 

 

1889 births
1958 deaths
Australian rules footballers from Melbourne
Melbourne Football Club players
Brighton Football Club players
People from Hawthorn, Victoria